Fit for a King, also known as FFAK, is an American metalcore band from Tyler, Texas formed in 2007. The band comprises guitarists Bobby Lynge and Daniel Gailey, vocalist Ryan Kirby, bassist Ryan "Tuck" O'Leary, and drummer Trey Celaya. They released two independent EPs entitled Fit for a King in 2008 and Awaken the Vesper in 2009. They also released one independent album, Descendants, in 2011. After the band signed to Solid State Records, they released six studio albums through this label: Creation/Destruction (2013), Slave to Nothing (2014), Deathgrip (2016), Dark Skies (2018), The Path (2020) and The Hell We Create, which was released on October 28, 2022. In addition, a redux version of their debut studio album was released through the label in 2013.

History

Independent days (2007–2012)
Fit for a King was formed in Tyler, Texas in 2007 by Jared Easterling, Aaron Decur, Justin Juno, Jared McFerron, Alex Danforth and Jed McNeill. The band had performed locally and regionally and released two EPs in their beginning years. In 2009, the band decided to begin touring full-time, and McNeill and McFerron left the band to pursue their education. Ryan Kirby from the band Bodies Awake (based in Fort Worth) joined the band in 2010 to replace Mason Wilson, who had recently replaced Danforth as the frontman. Kirby's Bodies Awake bandmate Bobby Lynge joined the band to play guitar. The band tracked their first independent debut studio album, Descendants, in 2011. With the release of their music video "Ancient Waters", the band started to gain a following. Bassist Decur left the band in 2011 to pursue a career in law enforcement and was replaced by Aaron Kadura who performed clean vocals alongside Easterling as well.

Solid State Records (2012–present)
In July 2012, the band had signed to Solid State Records. They released their second studio album Creation/Destruction on March 12, 2013 which also their first album through this label. The album sold more than 3,100 copies in its first week of sales. Billboard charted Creation/Destruction at No. 175, No. 17 on the Christian Albums chart, and No. 6 on the Hard Rock Albums.

In 2013, the band released the redux of their independent debut studio album, Descendants, which came out on November 25, 2013. Billboard charted Descendants at No. 38 on the Christian Albums chart, and at No. 8 on the Heatseekers Albums chart.

The band's third studio album, Slave to Nothing, was released on October 14, 2014 along with three singles including "Slave to Nothing" featuring Mattie Montgomery of For Today. The band released their fourth studio album Deathgrip on October 7, 2016.

The band announced their fifth studio album, Dark Skies, which was released on September 14, 2018. With this announcement the band also released the first single, "Tower of Pain", on June 1, 2018. This single was then followed by four other singles, "The Price of Agony", "Backbreaker", "When Everything Means Nothing" and "Oblivion".

On September 30, 2018, Bobby Lynge announced he would take a break from touring and partially part ways with the band on good terms, citing a need to be with his family and an interest in new business ventures. However, Lynge says he will still be involved in the writing process for the band's next album and he does not exclude to go on tour again with the band.

On March 13, 2020, the band unveiled a new single titled "Breaking the Mirror" along with an accompanying lyric video. On May 14, after unveiling some artworks the prior couple days, the band announced during the global COVID-19 pandemic a surprise collaboration with We Came as Romans. The collaboration included both bands' vocalists being featured on reworked version of their recent tracks and both bands will also release a limited merch line to promote the collaboration.

On July 8, the band announced that their sixth studio album The Path would be released on September 18, 2020. On July 10, the band released the second single "God of Fire" featuring Ryo Kinoshita of Crystal Lake. On August 6, the band released the third single "Locked (In My Head)".

On August 25, the band teased on their social media accounts that the fourth and final single titled "Annihilation" would be released on August 28. On that day, three weeks before the album release, the band released the single. On September 18, the day of the album release, the band released a music video for the title track. On April 9, 2021, the band unveiled another new version of their recent tracks with Silent Planet. On July 16, they dropped a new collaboration EP, Guardians of the Path, with August Burns Red. On December 3, it was announced that founding drummer Jared Easterling had departed the band to play in Koe Wetzel's backing band. Later, it was announced that Trey Celaya of Invent Animate was the band's new drummer.

On June 23, 2022, Fit for a King released the single "Reaper" along with an accompanying music video. On August 10, the band unveiled another single called "End (The Other Side)" and its corresponding music video. They announced that their seventh studio album, The Hell We Create, would be released on October 28, 2022, while also revealed the album cover and the track list. On September 8, the third single "Falling Through the Sky" was published along with a music video. On October 13, two weeks before the album release, the band released the fourth and final single "Times Like This" featuring Jonathan Vigil of The Ghost Inside.

Band members

Current members
 Bobby Lynge – guitars, backing vocals (2010–present)
 Ryan Kirby – lead vocals (2014–present); unclean vocals (2010–2014)
 Ryan "Tuck" O'Leary – bass, clean vocals (2014–present)
 Daniel Gailey – guitars, backing vocals (2018–present)
 Trey Celaya – drums (2021–present); guitars (touring member 2018)

Former members
 Justin Juno – bass (2007–2008)
 Alex Danforth – unclean vocals (2007–2008)
 Jed McNeill – keyboards (2007–2009)
 Jared McFerron – guitars (2007–2009)
 Mason Wilson – lead vocals (2008–2010); guitars (2008)
 Aaron Decur – bass (2008–2011); guitars (2007–2008)
 Justin Hamra – guitars (2008–2013); backing vocals (2008–2010)
 Aaron "Olan" Kadura – bass, clean vocals (2011–2014)
 Jared Easterling – drums (2007–2021); clean vocals (2007–2014)

Timeline

Discography

Studio albums

EPs
 Fit for a King (2008)
 Awaken the Vesper (2009)

Singles

Music videos

Collaborations

References

External links
 
 HM Magazine story

2007 establishments in Texas
Metalcore musical groups from Texas
Musical groups established in 2007
Musical groups from Dallas
Musical quartets
Solid State Records artists